The Tanzanian women's cricket team is the team that represents the country of Tanzania in international women's cricket.

Tanzania won the inaugural African women's championships in 2004 and has been one of the best-performed ICC associate member teams in Africa. The team also finished runner-up in the 2006 and 2011 African championships, but is yet to qualify for a global event.

History
Organised women's cricket in Tanzania began in 1999, when the Tanzania Cricket Association (TCA) introduced "chanzo cricket" for girls into primary schools. A national under-15 team was created in 2002 for a regional tournament. The development of the sport has been hindered by social taboos against women's participation in sport, especially those with children.

The TCA hosted the inaugural African women's cricket championships in 2004, with limited involvement from the International Women's Cricket Council (IWCC). The national team was unbeaten, defeating Uganda, Kenya and Namibia in the round-robin and winning the final against Uganda by 8 wickets.

In March 2018, Tanzania was invited to participate in the 2018 ASEAN Women's T20 Open Tournament as a guest team, finishing as runner-up to the hosts Thailand.

In April 2018, the International Cricket Council (ICC) granted full Women's Twenty20 International (WT20I) status to all its members. Therefore, all Twenty20 matches played between Tanzania women and another international side since 1 July 2018 have been full WT20Is. 

In December 2020, the ICC announced the qualification pathway for the 2023 ICC Women's T20 World Cup. Tanzania were named in the 2021 ICC Women's T20 World Cup Africa Qualifier regional group, alongside ten other teams.

Tanzanian batter Fatuma Kibasu scored her second T20I century in September 2021, an innings of 127 not out from 66 balls against Eswatini in the 2021 ICC Women's T20 World Cup Africa Qualifier, becoming only the fifth woman and the first from an ICC associate member team to score multiple T20I centuries.

Current squad

This lists all the players who have played for Tanzania in the past 12 months or was named in the most recent squad. Updated on 21 December 2022.

Records and statistics
International Match Summary — Tanzania Women
 
Last updated 21 December 2022

Twenty20 International 

 Highest team total: 285/1 v. Mali, 22 June 2019 at Gahanga International Cricket Stadium, Kigali.
 Highest individual score: 127*, Fatuma Kibasu v. Eswatini, 14 September 2021 at Botswana Cricket Association Oval, Gaborone.
 Best individual bowling figures: 5/0, Nasra Saidi v. Mali, 22 June 2019 at Gahanga International Cricket Stadium, Kigali.

Most T20I runs for Tanzania Women

Most T20I wickets for Tanzania Women

T20I record versus other nations

Records complete to WT20I #1334. Last updated 21 December 2022.

See also
 List of Tanzania women Twenty20 International cricketers

References

External links
 Fixtures for African World Cup qualifiers

Cricket in Tanzania
Cricket, women's
Women's national cricket teams
Women
2006 establishments in Tanzania
Women's sport in Tanzania
Cricket clubs established in 2006